Eduard Friedrich Karl von Fransecky (16 November 1807 – 22 May 1890) was Prussian general who served in the Austro-Prussian War and the Franco-Prussian War.

Biography

Fransecky was born in 1807 in Gedern in a military family. In 1818 he entered a Prussian cadetschool in Potsdam. In 1825 he was commissioned as an ensign in the 16th Infantry regiment stationed in Düsseldorf. Between 1843 and 1857 Fransecky served in the Historical division of the Prussian general staff. He fought in the war against Denmark in 1848, serving in Schleswig.

In 1860 von Fransecky was attached to Oldenburg where he commanded an Oldenburgian infantry regiment. In November 1864 he was promoted to major-general and later to lieutenant-general. He was given command of the 7th Division stationed in Magdeburg. In the Austro-Prussian War his division was part of Second Army. His division was able during Münchengrätz, and Königgrätz. During Königgrätz, his division was able to find Austrians by advancing to Swiep Forest, where his division met with Austrians. And for these battles, he was given the Pour le Mérite. Between 1867 and 1869 von Fransecky served as inspector of the Saxon army.
 
In 1870 von Fransecky became the commanding general of the Prussian 2nd Corps. During the Franco-Prussian War the Prussian 2nd Corps was part of the German 2nd army commanded by Prince Friedrich Karl. Fransecky distinguished himself at Gravelotte, where he reached the battlefield after a 16-hour forced march. After Gravelotte, 2nd Corps was part of the troops besieging Metz. After the fall of Metz Fransecky and 2nd Corps were sent to Paris. During the Siege of Paris Fransecky was given command of the troops between Seine and Marne. On 2 December 1870 Ducrot tried to break through the German ring at Villiers but the sortie was stopped by troops under Fransecky.

In January 1871 2nd Corps was detached from the siege and placed under command of Edwin von Manteuffel's newly formed Army of the South. Under Manteuffel's command Fransecky took part in the operations in the Côte-d'Or and Jura against Bourbaki's Armée de l'Est. After Bourbaki's forces were defeated at Pontarlier and forced over the Swiss border, Fransecky was given command of 14th Corps in Strassbourg and awarded the Oak Leaves to his Pour le Mérite on 5 February 1871.

After the war he was given a dotation of 150.000 thaler. In 1879 he was made governor of Berlin. He resigned as governor due to health reasons in 1882. Eduard von Fransecky died in 1890 in Wiesbaden.

Awards and decorations
 Pour le Mérite (military), 20 September 1866; with Oak Leaves, 5 February 1871
 Knight of the Black Eagle, 3 April 1875; with Collar, 1876; in Diamonds, 1882
 Knight of the Red Eagle, 4th Class with Swords, 1848; Grand Cross with Oak Leaves and Swords on Ring, 2 September 1873
 Grand Commander's Cross of the Royal House Order of Hohenzollern, with Star, 23 September 1879
 Grand Cross of the Military Merit Order, 30 December 1870 (Württemberg)
 Military Merit Order (Bavaria)
 Grand Cross of the Albert Order, with War Decoration and Crown, 1871 (Saxony)
 Knight of St. George, 4th Class, 27 December 1870 (Russia)
 Grand Cross of the House and Merit Order of Peter Frederick Louis, with Golden Crown and Swords, 5 April 1875 (Oldenburg)

Literature
 Howard, Michael, The Franco-Prussian War: The German Invasion of France 1870–1871, New York: Routledge, 2001. .

References

1807 births
1890 deaths
People from Gedern
German military personnel of the Franco-Prussian War
Prussian people of the Austro-Prussian War
Generals of Infantry (Prussia)
Recipients of the Pour le Mérite (military class)
Recipients of the Military Merit Order (Bavaria)
Recipients of the Order of St. George of the Fourth Degree
Military personnel from Hesse